Bárbara Palacios Teyde de Manrique (born December 9, 1963) is a Venezuelan TV host, writer, Christian preacher and beauty queen. She is the third woman from Venezuela to win the Miss Universe pageant  on 21 July 1986 held in Panama.

Early life
Palacios was born in Madrid to divorced parents Bárbara Teyde (died September 2008) and Jorge Palacios. Her father was a Spanish actor and her mother was a Venezuelan actress with a prolific acting career in Venezuela. They moved to Caracas, Venezuela in the mid-1960s when Palacios was one and a half years old, and according to the laws of the time, of the South American country, she was considered Venezuelan by birth.

As she relates in her book presented in 2019, Atrévete a ser Bárbara (Dare to be Barbara), who was a member of a "dysfunctional family", with situations of domestic violence, where she had a childhood and adolescence full of abuse and mistreatment: «There was abuse in In general, there was physical abuse, a hit, and also verbal and emotional abuse ”, which she believes in some way interrupted her childhood and adolescence. She also narrates that when she was just six years old, she already carried a suitcase that was full of clothes and with which she wanted to leave home. She cried a lot and got up at night to ask his mother to call a church to give him the address of God's house.

Career
Barbara's first approach with Miss Venezuela was when she was barely twelve years old, when in the company of her mother they met the coach of the Venezuelan beauty queens, Osmel Sousa, and he told her "Your Barbarita one day you will be Miss Venezuela", to which she replied that she would never participate. At 17, Sousa called her again, inviting her to participate, but she ruled out the contest, because she was working to pay for her university studies and was not interested in being a beauty queen. Mr. Osmel did not lose hope, he called her for 5 years until he convinced her in 1986. Already a graduate and being a junior advertising executive, at 22 years of age she represented the Trujillo State in the 1986 edition of Miss Venezuela, performed at the Municipal Theater of the city of Caracas. She won the contest and received the crown from Silvia Martínez, Miss Venezuela 1985. In addition, she won the 1986 Miss South America in Caracas, Venezuela, where she also won the band as "Miss Photogenic South America" and then was the third Venezuelan to win the Miss Universe crown, which she obtained in Panama City on July 21. 1986.

Palacios has worked as a television host for over two decades, and has been a spokesperson for multinational corporations in the United States and Latin America. She has founded several advertising agencies, and  owns Barbara Palacios Corporation, a U.S.-based company that commercializes women products, with lines of jewelry and beauty products sold in stores under her name in Florida, United States. The Barbara Palacios Casual line of products is distributed in several Latin American countries. She is a public speaker and an advocate and promoter of a holistic lifestyle. She launched BP Inspiration, where she is the main motivational speaker.

Personal life
Palacios married Víctor Manrique in 1988. They have two sons, Víctor Tomás and Diego Alfonso..She has several half-siblings, among them Georgina Palacios and Gian Piero Pérez Spagna.

References

External links
 Miss Universe
 Miss Venezuela
 Barbara Palacios a lifeStyle

1963 births
Living people
Miss Universe 1986 contestants
Miss Universe winners
Miss Venezuela winners
People from Caracas
Spanish emigrants to Venezuela
Venezuelan emigrants to the United States
Venezuelan television presenters
Venezuelan women television presenters
Venezuelan beauty pageant winners
Venezuelan people of Spanish descent